is a single by Japanese idol girl group Kamen Joshi. It was released on January 1, 2015. It debuted in number one on the weekly Oricon Singles Chart, selling 131,513 copies.

Track listing

Type-A

Charts

References 

2015 singles
2015 songs
Japanese-language songs
Oricon Weekly number-one singles
Song articles with missing songwriters